Connick is a surname. Notable people with the surname include:
Charles Connick (1875-1945), prominent American stained glass artist
Harry Connick Jr. (born 1967), American singer, musician, and actor, son of Harry Connick Sr.
Harry Connick Sr. (born 1926), New Orleans district attorney and part-time singer
Connick v. Myers, a 1983 U.S. Supreme Court decision in a lawsuit brought against Harry Connick Sr.
 Patrick Connick (born 1961), Republican member of the Louisiana House of Representatives
 Robert E. Connick (1917–2014), a professor emeritus of chemistry at the University of California, Berkeley
 Seán Connick (born 1963), Irish Fianna Fáil politician